Blackburn with Darwen services is a service station located off J4 on the M65 motorway in Lancashire, England which opened in 2002 and is operated by Extra. It has a petrol station operated by Shell as well as a Travelodge hotel and many places to get food and drink, such as a McDonald's, Costa and Greggs.

References

External links
Official Website

Extra motorway service stations
Transport in Blackburn with Darwen